Leptanilla macauensis is a species of ant in the genus Leptanilla. Chi-Man Leong (梁志文), an undergraduate student at National Taiwan University at the time, first collected specimens of this species. The species was subsequently formally described by Leong, Yamane & Guénard in 2018, the species is only known from specimens collected from Macau by means of a Winkler extractor. The queen has yet to be described.

References

External links

Leptanillinae
Insects described in 2018
Hymenoptera of Asia
Insects of China